Suzy Q's were an American brand of snack cake produced and distributed by Hostess Brands similar to the Drake's Devil Dog. The oblong sandwich, of either devil's food cake or banana-flavored cake with white crème filling, was invented in 1961 and named after the daughter of Continental Baking Company Vice President Cliff Isaacson. The cake was initially discontinued in 2012, but was reintroduced in 2015, although with a different look. However, after backlash from fans, the original cake was reintroduced in 2018. The return was short-lived, however, as Hostess Brands removed all references to the again-discontinued Suzy Q from their website in late 2020.

References

External links

 Hostess Cakes Hostess Brands' Suzy Q website
 How to make Suzy Q's at home (archive link)
 Nutritional analysis of Suzy Q's

Products introduced in 1961
Hostess Brands brands
Discontinued products